Erik Schmidt may refer to:

 Erik Schmidt (painter) (1925–2014), painter and writer
 Erik Schmidt (handballer) (born 1992), German handball player
 Erik Schmidt (sailor) (born 1939), Brazilian sailor

See also
Erich Schmidt (disambiguation)
Eric Schmitt (disambiguation)
Eric Smidt, American businessman, Chairman and CEO of Harbor Freight Tools